Robin Carpenter (born June 20, 1992) is an American cyclist, who currently rides for UCI ProTeam . Carpenter was born in Philadelphia. He studied at Swarthmore College and graduated in 2014 with a degree in economics and environmental studies.

Major results

2010
 5th Overall Tour de  l'Abitibi
2011
 8th Bucks County Classic
2013
 1st Stage 3 Joe Martin Stage Race
 1st Puivelde Kermis
2014
 1st Stage 2 USA Pro Cycling Challenge
 National Under-23 Road Championships
2nd Time trial
4th Road race
2015
 1st Stage 2 San Dimas Stage Race
 2nd Overall Cascade Cycling Classic
2016
 1st  Overall Tour of Alberta
 1st  Overall Cascade Cycling Classic
 1st Stage 2 Tour of Utah
 3rd Overall Tour de Beauce
 4th Overall Joe Martin Stage Race
 4th The Reading 120
 10th Philadelphia International Cycling Classic
2017
 1st  Overall Joe Martin Stage Race
1st Points classification
1st Stage 4
 1st  Overall Cascade Cycling Classic
 1st Winston-Salem Cycling Classic
 1st  Points classification Tour de Beauce
 3rd Overall San Dimas Stage Race
1st Stage 2
 4th Road race, National Road Championships
 7th Overall Redlands Bicycle Classic
2018
 1st  Mountains classification Deutschland Tour
 2nd Road race, National Road Championships
 2nd Slag om Norg
 9th Overall Danmark Rundt
2019
 1st  Mountains classification Tour de Luxembourg
 2nd La Roue Tourangelle
 2nd Paris–Chauny
2021
 1st Stage 2 Tour of Britain

References

External links

1992 births
Living people
Sportspeople from Philadelphia
American male cyclists
Cyclists from Pennsylvania